Buffalo Assembly was a former General Motors manufacturing facility located in Buffalo, New York that produced Chevrolet vehicles. In 1923, GM opened the factory to build the Chevrolet Superior and while Chevrolet also had a factory at North Tarrytown Assembly the address was 1001 East Delevan Avenue and continued to manufacture until WWII, when it was refitted to build rear axles for passenger cars and trucks. In 1984, Chevrolet-Buffalo became part of GM-Saginaw where it was renamed Saginaw Gear and Axle. Production and operations ended in 2007. The Chevrolet Buffalo factory represented a long history of building automobiles in the area, along with Pierce-Arrow and the earlier Thomas Motor Company, while Ford still maintains a factory to date. It is currently identified as the Historic American Axle Building.

Models
Some of the models produced at the plant included:
 1923-1926 Chevrolet Superior (introduction of GM "A" platform)
 1927 Chevrolet Series AA Capitol
 1928 Chevrolet Series AB National
 1929 Chevrolet Series AC International
 1930 Chevrolet Series AD Universal
 1931 Chevrolet Series AE Independence
 1932 Chevrolet Series BA Confederate
 1933 Chevrolet Eagle
 1933-1936 Chevrolet Standard Six
 1933-1942 Chevrolet Master

See also
Military production during World War II

References

General Motors factories
Former motor vehicle assembly plants
Companies based in Buffalo, New York
Motor vehicle assembly plants in New York (state)
History of Buffalo, New York